Böksö-Jol is a village in the Jayyl District of Chüy Region of Kyrgyzstan. Its population was 1,183 in 2021. It is the seat of Taldy-Bulak rural community (ayyl aymagy). Bishkek - Osh road passes through the settlement.

References

Populated places in Chüy Region